Leithtown is an unincorporated village in Loudoun County, Virginia. Leithtown lies to the west of Goose Creek at the crossroads of Foxcroft, Pot House, and Mountville roads. It is the home of the Foxcroft School and saw cavalry action in the Battle of Middleburg and Battle of Upperville in 1863.

Unincorporated communities in Loudoun County, Virginia
Washington metropolitan area
Unincorporated communities in Virginia